L. maxima may refer to:

 Lacerta maxima, an extinct lizard
 Lysimachia maxima, a plant endemic to Hawaii